Vroomshoop is a railway station in Vroomshoop, The Netherlands. The station was opened on 1 October 1906 and is on the single track Mariënberg–Almelo railway. The line is primarily used by school children in the morning and afternoon. The station has 2 platforms. With an average of 100 passengers per day, it is one of the least used stations in the Netherlands. The train services are operated by Arriva.

Previously, this station was called Den Ham-Vroomshoop (1906-1952).

Train services

Bus services

There is no normal bus service at this station. The nearest bus stops are Tonnendijk (direction: Westerhaar) and Koningin Beatrixstraat (direction: Den Ham) on the Hammerweg.

However, there is an emergency bus stop.

References

External links
NS website 
Dutch Public Transport journey planner 

Railway stations in Overijssel
Railway stations opened in 1906
Twenterand
1906 establishments in the Netherlands
Railway stations in the Netherlands opened in the 20th century